The IIT Delhi metro station is located on the Magenta Line of the Delhi Metro. It was opened to public on 29 May 2018.

Controversy 

Indian Institute of Technology-Delhi (IIT-D) has approached the authorities to remove the mention of IIT or the coaching institute FIITJEE from the name of the Metro station near its campus, saying it could mislead students into thinking they have a tie-up. FIITJEE has become the sponsor of the soon-to-be opened Metro station opposite IIT-D. Signage installed at the station has named it FIITJEE IIT, coupling the two names.

IIT Delhi has approached the high court opposing the naming rights of a metro station near the institute being acquired by a coaching institute. High Court decided in favor of IIT and ordered to remove FIITJEE branding from the IIT Metro Station. The new signage displays only the institute's name along with that of Bureau of Indian Standards (BIS).

On this the director of IIT Delhi quoted to media "We never wanted the IIT's name to be associated with any coaching institute holding commercial interests. We are happy the issue has been settled, BIS is a good brand to be associated with as it aligns with the image of our institute. Both (IITD and BIS) set standards in their own domains", said Rao. The BIS is the national standards body of India working under the aegis of ministry of consumer affairs, food & public distribution."

History

The station

Station layout

Entry/exit

Connections

Bus
Delhi Transport Corporation bus routes number 344, 448, 448B, 448CL, 507CL, 620, 764, 764EXT, 764S, 774, AC-620, AC-764, serves the station from nearby IIT Gate bus stop.

See also

Delhi
List of Delhi Metro stations
Transport in Delhi
Delhi Metro Rail Corporation
Delhi Suburban Railway
Delhi Monorail
Delhi Transport Corporation
South East Delhi
Indian Institute of Technology Delhi
National Capital Region (India)
List of rapid transit systems
List of metro systems

References

External links

 Delhi Metro Rail Corporation Ltd. – Official site
 Delhi Metro Annual Reports
 

Delhi Metro stations
Railway stations in South Delhi district